The history of the Tula teacher training college №1 begins on October 6, 1945 when the decision of Tuloblispolkom and the order of the Ministry of Public Education of the Russian Federation was open Tula pedagogical school: the area felt sharp requirement for cadres of teachers of primary classes.

During the existence the school some times changed the name, was exposed to reorganization, moved from one building in another. Since September, 1st, 1992 Tula pedagogical school was reorganized in the Tula teacher training college №1. In 1992 on the basis of college with assistance of the Tula pedagogical university of L.N.Tolstoy and Department of education  preparation of teachers of initial classes with the right of teaching of English language at elementary school has been organized. The deputy director on scientifically-methodical work, the professor of chair of English philology Tula pedagogical university  A.A.Malchenko became the head of work on introduction of a new speciality.

References

External links
 http://www.tpk1.ru/history.htm

Teachers colleges in Russia
Buildings and structures in Tula, Russia